Rhagoletotrypeta is a genus of tephritid fruit flies in the family Tephritidae. These species originated in the Americas.

Species
This genus includes the following species:
Rhagoletotrypeta annulata Aczel, 1954
Rhagoletotrypeta argentinensis
Rhagoletotrypeta intermedia Norrbom, 1994
Rhagoletotrypeta morgantei Norrbom, 1994
Rhagoletotrypeta parallela Norrbom, 1994
Rhagoletotrypeta pastranai Aczel, 1954
Rhagoletotrypeta rohweri Foote, 1966
Rhagoletotrypeta uniformis Steyskal, 1981
Rhagoletotrypeta xanthogastra Aczel, 1951

References

Trypetinae
Tephritidae genera